is a Shinto shrine in the city of Morioka, Iwate in northern Japan. The shrine is noted for its annual festival on the second Saturday in June, which is famous for the Chagu Chagu Umakko, a horse parade which was recognized in 1978 as an Intangible Folk Cultural Property. In 1996 the sound of the bells of the Chagu Chagu Umakko was selected by the Ministry of the Environment as one of the 100 Soundscapes of Japan. The shrine is also noted for its displays of yabusame horse archery during its annual festival on September 15.

History
The Morioka Hachimangū was established in 1062 during the late Heian period when Minamoto no Yoriyoshi brought a bunrei of the Minamoto clan’s tutelary shrine, the Iwashimizu Hachimangū in Kyoto to pray for victory in his campaign against the Abe clan in the Former Nine Years War. The shrine was rebuilt in 1593 by the Nanbu clan to be the protective shrine for Morioka Castle. 
Under the State Shinto system of shrine ranking from 1871 through 1946, the Morioka Hachimangū was officially designated as a "prefectural shrine". The Edo-period shrine structures burned down in 1884. The present main structure dates from 2006.

Shinto belief
The shrine is dedicated to the veneration of the Shinto kami Hachiman. Hachiman has been recognized as an amalgamation of the semi-legendary Emperor Ojin and his consort, Empress Jingū.

See also
 List of Shinto shrines
 Modern system of ranked Shinto Shrines

References
 Breen, John and Mark Teeuwen. (2000).  Shinto in History: Ways of the Kami. Honolulu: University of Hawaii Press. ; 
 Ponsonby-Fane, Richard. (1959).  The Imperial House of Japan. Kyoto: Ponsonby Memorial Society. 
 Ponsonby-Fane, Richard. (1962).  Studies in Shinto and Shrines. Kyoto: Ponsonby Memorial Society.

External links

Notes

1060s establishments in Japan
1062 establishments in Asia
Shinto shrines in Iwate Prefecture
Morioka, Iwate
Mutsu Province
Hachiman shrines
Religious buildings and structures completed in 1062
11th-century Shinto shrines
Beppyo shrines